Pippa was a "pocket-sized" fashion doll produced by British toymaker Palitoy between 1972 and 1980. She was a 6.5 inch fashion doll with numerous friends, fashions, an apartment, a car, even her own hair salon. Similar to Topper's Dawn doll, Pippa was marketed as "the pocket money fashion doll that puts fashion in your pocket". The small stature of the doll also meant that production costs were generally lower than market competitors such as Sindy and Barbie.

The Pippa doll had many different fashionable clothing pieces, including miniskirts, minidresses and top and bottom combos. There were also more regal, formal dresses, and outfits relating to different jobs.

Employing subtle makeover techniques and fashion variations, Palitoy was able to produce over 30 different Pippa and Friends by using only three head molds, different coloured vinyls and hair styles. Pippa's first three friends launched in 1972 were Marie, Tammie and Britt. To reflect Britain's increasingly diverse ethnic population Pippa later had an Asian friend named Jasmine and a black friend named Mandy. More friends like Gail, Emma, Rosemary and Penny and a boyfriend Pete were also added to the line.

Another Pippa doll was produced as a male counterpart; Pete, Pippa's friend. 

1970s toys
Fashion dolls
Products introduced in 1972